Love Me Back is the second studio album by American R&B singer Jazmine Sullivan, released on November 29, 2010, by J Records. Sullivan co-wrote the album with producers Missy Elliott, Ne-Yo, No I.D., Los da Mystro, and Salaam Remi, among others.

The album debuted at number 17 on the Billboard 200 and sold 57,000 copies in its first week. It produced two singles, including the lead single "Holding You Down (Goin' in Circles)", which peaked at number three on the Hot R&B/Hip-Hop Songs chart. Love Me Back received universal acclaim from music critics, who praised its songwriting and Sullivan's singing.

Background 
The album is the follow-up to Sullivan's debut album Fearless (2008), which was well received by music critics, sold 517,000 copies, and earned Sullivan seven Grammy Award nominations. Recording sessions for the album took place at various recording locations, including Carrington House Studios, Goldmind Studios, and Lostas Studi in Atlanta, Georgia, CNSO Recording Studio in Czech Republic, Cutting Room Studios, Germano Studios, KMA Studios, and MSR Studios in New York, New York, Instrument Zoo in Miami, Florida, Metropolis Studios in London, Waya Flow Studios and Westlake Studios in Los Angeles, California, Strawberrybee Studios in California, and The Studio in Philadelphia, Pennsylvania.

Marketing and sales 
Love Me Back was released by J Records on November 29, 2010, in the United Kingdom, November 30 in the United States, and December 8 in Japan. Prior to its release, Sullivan accompanied R&B recording artist Mary J. Blige on the latter's Music Saved My Life concert tour during October 2010. Love Me Back was also promoted with two singles: "Holding You Down (Goin' in Circles)" was released on July 10, and "10 Seconds" on October 15. The album's cover was premiered on September 21, 2010 and features Sullivan dressed in all black, leaning against a vintage model Chevrolet Impala, a reference to her hit single "Bust Your Windows".

Love Me Back debuted at number 17 on the Billboard 200 chart, with first-week sales of 57,000 copies in the United States. It also entered at five on Billboards R&B/Hip-Hop Albums and at number 12 on its Digital Albums chart. The album ultimately spent six weeks on the Billboard 200.

Critical reception 

Love Me Back was met with widespread critical acclaim. At Metacritic, which assigns a normalized rating out of 100 to reviews from professional critics, the album received an average score of 82, based on 11 reviews.

Reviewing for AllMusic, Andy Kellman said the album "sprawls and stuns in equal measure". In Spin magazine, Maura Johnston found Sullivan "both feisty and classy", while Michael Cragg of The Guardian said her singing is marked by experience and accommodates each song. Jon Pareles, writing in The New York Times, said Sullivan sounds "narrow and jagged" on the album, "with more grain and more tears as she applies gospel dynamics to her venting". New York magazine's Nitsuh Abebe described her voice as "warm, well-textured, and big — authentically, naturally big", and stated, "the warmth and weight of the songwriting and production live up to the singing". Alex Macpherson of The Quietus commended Sullivan for "letting [her] ideas run riot while staying true to genre values" on the "most creative R&B album of the year". In his review for MSN Music, Robert Christgau felt that the songwriting is "a big extra difference maker, with enough pop moves to lighten the overall mood" amid "the soulful melodrama". He believed Sullivan role-plays "with unflinching intelligence" on each song and, although the lyrics could be based on personal history, "it's simpler just to wish every pro was such an astute student of the female condition."

Some reviewers were less receptive. Jon Dolan of Rolling Stone expressed ambivalence about Sullivan's decision to play "a little nicer, adhering to the Mary J. Blige school of gritty, nuanced hip-hop soul". Slant Magazines Sal Cinquemani felt that the album "fails to reprise many of its predecessor's themes or explore any overarching new ones". Margaret Wappler of the Los Angeles Times said that Sullivan "walks herself to the precipice of emotion without falling off", but lamented what she believed to be not enough "experimentation".

Track listing 

Notes
  denotes vocal producer

Personnel 
Credits are adapted from AllMusic.

 Guy Aroch – photography
 Christian Baker – engineer
 Anthony Bell – instrumentation, producer, programming
 Ricky Blaze – drum programming, producer
 Jesse Bonds – guitar
 Anita Marisa Boriboon – art direction, design
 Cary Clark – engineer
 Los DaMystro – conductor, producer
 Gleyder "Gee" Disla – engineer
 DJ Showoff – vocals
 Peter Edge – producer
 Missy "Misdemeanor" Elliott – engineer, executive producer, producer
 Paul J. Falcone – engineer
 Rick Frederick – engineer
 Toby Gad – engineer, piano, producer
 Anthony "Rocky" Gallo – engineer
 Erwin Gorostiza – creative director
 Chuck Harmony – producer
 Brandon Henderson – assistant
 Vincent Henry – flute, alto saxophone, baritone saxophone, tenor saxophone, wah wah guitar
 Trevor Jerideau – producer
 Mike "TrakGuru" Johnson – engineer
 Rob Kinelski – engineer
 StayBent KrunkaDelic – keyboards
 Dave Kutch – mastering
 Lamb – drum programming, engineer, producer

 Erik Madrid – assistant, mixing engineer
 Bei Maejor – producer
 Manny Marroquin – mixing
 Scott Naughton – engineer
 Ne-Yo – producer, vocals
 No I.D. – producer
 Brandon Parks – engineer
 Calvin Parmer – bass
 Christian Plata – assistant
 Prolyfic – additional production
 Questlove – drums, engineer
 Kevin Randolph – keyboards
 Rebel One – management
 Geno Regist – engineer
 Salaam Remi – bass, drum programming, drums, executive producer, Fender rhodes, keyboards, producer, strings
 Harold Robinson – bass
 Andros Rodriguez – engineer
 Davide Rossi – cello, string arrangements, strings, viola, violin
 Ashunta Sheriff – make-up
 Jazmine Sullivan – producer, vocals
 Pam Sullivan – management
 Pamela Watson – stylist
 Sam Wheat – engineer
 Yusef Williams – hair stylist
 Steve Wyreman – guitar

Charts

Weekly charts

Year-end charts

Release history

References

External links 
 
 

2010 albums
Jazmine Sullivan albums
Albums produced by Chuck Harmony
Albums produced by Missy Elliott
Albums produced by No I.D.
Albums produced by Salaam Remi
Albums produced by Toby Gad
J Records albums